Maries County is a county located in the U.S. state of Missouri. As of the 2020 census, its population was 8,432. Its county seat is Vienna.  The county was organized March 2, 1855 and named for the Maries River and Little Maries River. The word "Maries" is derived from the French word marais, which means "marsh, lake, or pond".

Geography

Adjacent counties
Osage County (north)
Gasconade County (northeast)
Phelps County (southeast)
Pulaski County (southwest)
Miller County (west)

Major highways
  U.S. Route 63
 Route 28
 Route 42
 Route 52
 Route 68
 Route 133

Demographics

As of the census of 2000, there were 8,903 people, 3,519 households, and 2,502 families residing in the county.  The population density was 17 people per square mile (7/km2).  There were 4,149 housing units at an average density of 8 per square mile (3/km2).  The racial makeup of the county was 97.43% White, 0.33% Black or African American, 0.55% Native American, 0.11% Asian, 0.35% from other races, and 1.24% from two or more races. Approximately 1.16% of the population were Hispanic or Latino of any race.

There were 3,519 households, out of which 31.60% had children under the age of 18 living with them, 59.00% were married couples living together, 7.70% had a female householder with no husband present, and 28.90% were non-families. 25.70% of all households were made up of individuals, and 12.30% had someone living alone who was 65 years of age or older.  The average household size was 2.51 and the average family size was 3.00.

In the county, the population was spread out, with 26.00% under the age of 18, 7.30% from 18 to 24, 26.50% from 25 to 44, 24.50% from 45 to 64, and 15.60% who were 65 years of age or older.  The median age was 38 years. For every 100 females there were 101.20 males.  For every 100 females age 18 and over, there were 97.90 males.

The median income for a household in the county was $31,925, and the median income for a family was $39,187. Males had a median income of $28,524 versus $20,705 for females. The per capita income for the county was $15,662.  About 10.10% of families and 13.10% of the population were below the poverty line, including 17.30% of those under age 18 and 13.20% of those age 65 or over.

2020 Census

Education

Public schools
Maries County R-I School District – Vienna
Vienna Elementary School (PK-06)
Vienna High School (07-12)
Maries County R-II School District – Belle
Belle Elementary School (PK-05)
Maries County Middle School (06-08)
Belle High School (09-12)

Private schools
Visitation Inter-Parish School – Vienna (K-08) – Roman Catholic

Public libraries
 Heartland Regional Library System

Politics

Local
The Democratic Party predominantly controls politics at the local level in Maries County. Democrats hold all but four of the elected positions in the county.

State

All of Maries County is a part of Missouri's 62nd District in the Missouri House of Representatives and is represented by Tom Hurst (R-Meta).

All of Maries County is a part of Missouri's 6th District in the Missouri Senate and is currently represented by Mike Kehoe (R-Jefferson City).

Federal

All of Maries County is included in Missouri's 3rd Congressional District and is currently represented by Blaine Luetkemeyer (R-St. Elizabeth) in the U.S. House of Representatives.

Political culture

Missouri presidential preference primary (2008)

Former U.S. Senator Hillary Clinton (D-New York) received more votes, a total of 844, than any candidate from either party in Maries County during the 2008 presidential primary.

Communities

Cities and towns
Argyle (also in Osage County)
Belle (a small portion extends into Osage County)
Vienna (county seat)

Unincorporated communities

 Bend
 Brinktown
 Hayden
 High Gate
 Lanes Prairie
 Light
 Lindell
 Lois
 Paydown
 Safe
 Stickney
 Sudheimer
 Summerfield
 Tavern
 Van Cleve
 Venus
 Vichy

See also
National Register of Historic Places listings in Maries County, Missouri

References

Further reading
 History of Cole, Moniteau, Morgan, Benton, Miller, Maries and Osage counties, Missouri : from the earliest time to the present, including a department devoted to the preservation of sundry personal, business, professional and the private records; besides a valuable fund of notes, original observations, etc. etc. (1889)online

External links
 Digitized 1930 Plat Book of Maries County  from University of Missouri Division of Special Collections, Archives, and Rare Books

 
1855 establishments in Missouri